Christopher Michael Jack Gorell Barnes (born May 1974)  is an English digital entrepreneur and marine conservationist best known as executive producer of the award-winning documentary The End of the Line.

Early life
Gorell Barnes was born to Henry Gorell Barnes (1939-1983), merchant banker and a director of Morgan Grenfell, and Gillian (née Carruthers), a therapist. His paternal grandfather was Sir William Lethbridge Gorell Barnes (1909-1987), a War Cabinet official later of the Treasury and Colonial Office (where he was Deputy Under Secretary of State from 1959 to 1963), and who had been Personal Assistant to Prime Minister Clement Attlee from 1946 to 1948. His paternal great-grandfather was Sir Frederic Gorell Barnes (1856-1939), M.P. for Faversham, Kent from 1895-1900, Assistant Food Commissioner and Commissioner of the Education and Propaganda Branch of the Ministry of Food from 1918 to 1921. The Gorell Barnes family were of Ashgate House, Ashgate, Derbyshire, with the Barons Gorell descending from Henry, elder brother of Chris Gorell Barnes's ancestor Charles (1818-1886; of Mossley Hill, Lancashire, J.P., a merchant). The politician and colliery owner Alfred Barnes was the youngest brother of Henry and Charles.

Gorell Barnes was raised at Maida Vale, and studied at Bedales and the European Business School at Regent's University London.

Career
Gorell Barnes founded a digital content agency called Adjust Your Set in 2008.
He was named by the London Evening Standard newspaper in 2013 as one of the most powerful 'Tech Stars' in the UK. Adjust Your Set was named in New Media Age's Top 100 Interactive Agencies 2010 as 'one to watch' and in 2011 it was named as a winner in the Brightcove Online Video Innovation Awards.
Gorell Barnes has sat on the board of Eagle Eye Solutions, a digital consumerism business, since 2007. Other board members include Sir Terry Leahy, former Tesco chief executive.

Gorell Barnes was executive producer for The End of the Line, a documentary film that changed attitudes towards seafood, including among companies such as Pret A Manger and Marks & Spencer.
It won the inaugural Puma Creative Impact Award in 2011 for its success in changing consumer behaviour.

A study by the BRITDOC Foundation found that it had been seen by more than one million people and had created press and media attention worth more than £4 million. The film was described by the Chicago Tribune as "an apocalyptic documentary that is as beautiful as it is damning".

Marine conservation

In 2009, Gorell Barnes and fellow producer George Duffield founded a marine conservation charity, the Blue Marine Foundation which aims to create marine reserves. In 2010 it brokered a deal that created a huge marine reserve around the Chagos Islands and two years later one that protected the waters around Turneffe Atoll in the Caribbean. Among its supporters are Helena Bonham Carter.

Personal life
Gorell Barnes lives in London with his long-term partner Martha Lane Fox, Baroness Lane-Fox of Soho. Their identical twin sons, Milo and Felix, were born in 2016.

References

External links
 Adjust Your Set site
 Eagle Eye Solutions site
 The End of the Line site
 Blue Marine Foundation site

British film producers
British conservationists
Living people
British documentary film producers
Film people from London
Place of birth missing (living people)
1974 births